Enrique López Zarza (born 25 October 1957) is a Mexican former football forward and manager.

Career
López Zarza spent most of his career playing for Pumas. He also had spells with Puebla F.C., Atlante F.C., Cobras de Ciudad Juárez and Club León.

López Zarza made 23 appearances for Mexico in the 1978 FIFA World Cup finals in Argentina.

References

External links

1957 births
Living people
Mexico under-20 international footballers
Mexico international footballers
1978 FIFA World Cup players
Club Universidad Nacional footballers
Club Puebla players
Atlante F.C. footballers
Club León footballers
Mexican football managers
Club Universidad Nacional managers
Club Necaxa managers
Club León managers
Footballers from the State of Mexico
Liga MX players
Association football forwards
Mexican footballers